Micropterix gertraudae is an extinct species of moth belonging to the family Micropterigidae. It was described by Kurz M. A & M. E. Kurz in 2010. It is only known from the single type specimen in Baltic amber, which has been mined at Palmnicken (now Yantarnyy) near Kaliningrad.

References

†
Fossil Lepidoptera
Baltic amber